Kimberling Lutheran Cemetery is a historic Lutheran cemetery and national historic district located near Rural Retreat, Wythe County, Virginia. The cemetery includes approximately about 50 early Germanic sandstone monuments dating from 1800 to 1850. The associated Kimberlin  Lutheran Church was built in 1913, and is a large frame structure with two unequal-sized towers.

It was listed on the National Register of Historic Places in 1980.

References

External links
 
 
 

Historic districts on the National Register of Historic Places in Virginia
Lutheran churches in Virginia
Lutheran cemeteries in the United States
Churches in Wythe County, Virginia
Properties of religious function on the National Register of Historic Places in Virginia
National Register of Historic Places in Wythe County, Virginia